Paramontana exilis is a species of sea snail, a marine gastropod mollusk in the family Raphitomidae.

Description
The length of the shell attains 5.5 mm.

The whorls are nearly plane and longitudinally plicately ribbed. The ribs are small and close, descending from the sutures. The  aperture is very short. The siphonal canal is short and open. The shell is reddish chestnut, the ribs whitish, with a dark band below the middle of the body whorl.

Distribution
This marine species occurs in the  Indo-west Pacific, Hawaii, Coral Sea, Australia (Queensland, Western Australia)

References

 Pease, W.H. 1867. Description of marine gasteropodae inhabiting Polynesia. American Journal of Conchology 3(3): 211–222 pl. 15
 Kilburn, R.N. 1988. Turridae (Mollusca: Gastropoda) of southern Africa and Mozambique. Part 4 Drilliinae, Crassispirinae and Strictispirinae. Annals of the Natal Museum 29(1): 167-320 
 Garrett, A. 1873. Descriptions of new species of marine shells inhabiting the South Sea Islands. Proceedings of the Academy of Natural Sciences, Philadelphia 1873: 209–231, pls 2-3

External links
 

exilis
Gastropods described in 1860